Emiliotia is a genus of sea snails, marine gastropod mollusks in the family Colloniidae.

Species
Species within the genus Emiliotia include:

 Emiliotia immaculata Ortea, Espinosa & Fernandez-Garcès, 2008
 Emiliotia juliocesari Fernández-Garcés, Rubio & Rolán, 2019
 Emiliotia rubrostriata (Rolán, Rubio, & Fernández-Garcés, 1997)
Species brought into synonymy
 Emiliotia inmaculatus [sic] : synonym of Emiliotia inmaculata Ortea, Espinosa & Fernández-Garcés, 2008 (wrong grammatical agreement of specific epithet)

References

 Faber M.J. 2006. Marine gastropods from the ABC islands and other localities. 8. On the distribution of "Bothropoma" rubrostriatum Rolán, Rubio & Fernández-Garcés, 1997, with the introduction of Emiliotia, n.gen. (Gastropoda: Turbinidae). Miscellanea Malacologica, 2(1): 13-1

Colloniidae